Macropoliana asirensis is a moth of the  family Sphingidae. It is known from Saudi Arabia and Yemen.

References

Macropoliana
Moths described in 1980